NVK Sakha (national broadcaster company Sakha, Национальная вещательная компания Саха, "Саха"  көрдөрөр иһитиннэрэр тэрилтэтэ), the largest media company in the Republic of Sakha (Yakutia).  The company owns dozens of TV channels in Yakutia, Russia, and other countries.  The main broadcasting languages are Yakut, English, Russian and Evenk.  It was founded in 1992 after the collapse of the USSR.  70% of the shares are owned by the Russian VGTRK, 25% are owned by Yakutia, and 5% are in free float.  NVK Sakha owns its own animation and film production studios, and some music studios.  Since 2018, it has also been streaming 24/7 on YouTube.

Companies based in Sakha Republic
Television companies of Russia